Warner Music Vision (also known as Warner Vision) was a music video company formed in 1990 by Warner Music International to make music videos from artists and bands on Warner Bros. Records, Maverick Records, Sire Records, Atlantic Records, Elektra Records and other Warner Music Group labels and to release them on video. Worldcat lists thousands of published works for Warner Music Vision.

In 2006, Warner Music Vision merged with the Rights Company to form Warner Music Entertainment.

Labels

WarnerVision Entertainment 
The label also had a sublabel, WarnerVision Entertainment (formerly A*Vision Entertainment from 1990 until 1995), to release special interest products.

The A*Vision Entertainment label was set up in 1990 by Atlantic Records, and the first release was the documentary Banned in the U.S.A., a 2 Live Crew documentary video. It was expanded in 1991 when it partnered with Penthouse to distribute videocassettes under the Penthouse Video label. In 1992, A*Vision gradually expanded by signing a deal with View Video, which A*Vision could co-distribute with the View Video label.

Two other labels: KidVision, primarily focusing on children's videos, and NightVision, to release videos strictly at an adult audience, were set up by A*Vision as well, in January 1993. Also in 1993, Rhino Home Video, a division of Rhino Records, was signing a deal with A*Vision Entertainment, after its deal with Uni concludes. Also that year, BodyVision was launched as an label of A*Vision Entertainment, designed to release health and fitness videos, and the first videos picked up by A*Vision were Kathy Smith workout videos, which were developed after Media Home Entertainment closed its doors.

A*Vision Entertainment also launched a label dedicated to motion pictures, which is called Atlantic Group Films. The first film released under the label was the direct-to-video erotic thriller Indecent Behavior, which ranked No. 36 in the Billboard charts in its first week. In 1994, Saban Entertainment signed a deal with A*Vision Entertainment to release titles under the Saban Home Entertainment and Libra Home Entertainment labels.

Later on, on January 21, 1995, it was shifted from Atlantic Records to Warner Bros. Records, which was rebranded to WarnerVision Entertainment on March 1, 1995, with the accompanying film unit was renamed from Atlantic Group Films to WarnerVision Films to reflect the change. Shortly afterwards, Dualstar Video, the video imprint of the Olsen twins' Dualstar Entertainment Group was subsequently moved from BMG Kidz to WarnerVision through a new distribution pact.

On December 23, 1995, Time Warner is planning on to spinoff its WarnerVision line to president Stuart Hersch, who is planning on to change its name back to A*Vision Entertainment, which WEA could continue to distribute. The spinoff was then nullified in 1996, with distribution shifting to Warner Home Video. While the Dualstar Video deal continued on under Warner Home Video, the Saban Entertainment deal didn't, with the company switching distributors to 20th Century Fox Home Entertainment in October of that year.

Warner Reprise Video 
The company also has another notable sublabel, Warner Reprise Video (formerly Warner Music Video from 1984 until 1986), which was in operation, focusing on music video releases.

The company was initially set up in 1984 as Warner Music Video by WEA as a label to distribute the Warner Bros. Records catalog. It initially kicked off with a 20-minute compilation of Madonna's most recent hits. In 1986, Warner Music Video was then renamed to Warner Reprise Video, in order to add more music titles.

Elektra Entertainment 
The company also had another sublabel, that of Elektra Entertainment, which is operated by Elektra Records, that was established in 1986 to release the music video catalog of its Elektra Records label.

WEA Music Video 
The company operated Warner-Elektra-Atlantic (WEA), also known as WEA Music Video in Canada and Australia, as their worldwide sales and distribution unit. From 1992 to 1996, WEA also distributed releases by LIVE Entertainment following the latter's stint with MCA Distributing Corporation.

Jane Evans 
A former operations director of Warner Music Vision, Jane Evans, had a park named after her in Hampstead, London, 2018.

References

External links 
 Warner Music Vision On Discogs
 Warner Reprise Video On Discogs
 Warner Reprise Video on IMDb

Warner Music labels
Home video companies of the United States
American companies established in 1990
2006 disestablishments
Former Time Warner subsidiaries